English Station is a neighborhood of Louisville, Kentucky centered along Shelbyville Road (US 60) and the Floyds Fork watershed.

Neighborhoods in Louisville, Kentucky